Kullervo, Op. 15, is a symphonic poem for orchestra written in 1913 by Finnish composer Leevi Madetoja. The piece premiered on 14 October 1913 with Madetoja conducting the Helsinki Philharmonic Society.

Background

Composition
Although Madetoja belonged to national romantic movement in Finland, he did not—unlike many of the movement's artists and composers, such as Akseli Gallen-Kallela and Jean Sibelius—often turn to the Kalevala as a source of inspiration. Indeed, Kullervo is Madetoja's only notable composition after the national epic. Madetoja was the fourth composer to tackle the subject of Kullervo. First, in 1860, Filip von Schantz wrote the Kullervo Overture, which he had intended as the prelude to an opera; this piece premiered the same year in Helsinki at the opening of the Swedish Theatre. Second, in 1880, Robert Kajanus composed and premiered in Leipzig Kullervo's Funeral March; though Wagnerian in its chromaticism, it makes use of the Finnish folk song O Mother, so pitiable and poor!. Finally, in 1892, Jean Sibelius composed and premiered in Helsinki the choral symphony Kullervo, for baritone, soprano, mixed chorus, and orchestra; however, Sibelius withdrew his Kullervo in 1893, and therefore, it could not have served as a model for Madetoja; it is also unlikely that he was familiar with the pieces by von Schantz and Kajanus. Instead, the most readily-available Kalevala-themed examples would have been Sibelius's Lemminkäinen Suite (from which two numbers, The Swan of Tuonela and Lemminkäinen's Return, had been published in 1900) and Pohjola's Daughter.

Premiere

Kullervo premiered on 14 October 1913 with Madetoja conducting the Helsinki Philharmonic Society.

Instrumentation
Kullervo is scored for the following instruments:

Woodwinds: piccolo, 2 flutes, 2 oboes, 2 clarinets (in A), bass clarinet (in A), and 2 bassoons
Brass: 4 horns (in F), 2 trumpets (in C), 3 trombones, and tuba
Percussion: timpani, triangle, cymbals, bass drum, tambourine, and castanets
Strings: violins, violas, cellos, double basses, and harp

 published the symphonic poem in 1947; Fennica Gehrman is the current distributor.

Recordings
The sortable table below lists commercially available recordings of Kullervo:

Notes, references, and sources

Liner notes
 
 
 

Journals and magazines

Newspaper articles (by date)

Compositions by Leevi Madetoja
20th-century classical music
1913 compositions
Symphonic poems
Music based on the Kalevala